Asghar Bichareh (Persian: اصغر بیچاره; June 11, 1927 – June 11, 2016) was an Iranian photographer and actor. Bichareh was a photographer for the Iranian film and music industries, as well as having a studio and acting in over 23 films. He died of laryngeal cancer in 2016 in Los Angeles, where he spent the last few years of his life. Bichareh was also known for his extensive collection of old cameras and cinema and theater photos. He had the second largest collection of photography cameras in Iran after Mohammad-Ali Jadidoleslam.

References

External links

1927 births
2016 deaths
Iranian photographers